Mohammad Bat'haei, also spelt Mohammad Bathaei (born June 1963 ) is an Iranian educator and the former Minister of Education. He was vice education minister from 2014 until 2016 and also served as the acting minister from 19 October after the resignation of previous minister, Ali Asghar Fani until 1 November 2016. He was appointed as the Vice Minister of Education for Management Development and Logistics on 22 July 2014.

References 

1963 births
Living people
Iranian educators
Education ministers
People from Tehran
21st-century Iranian educators
20th-century Iranian educators